Ethmia tilneyorum is a moth in the family Depressariidae. Its habitat consists of dry forests.

The larvae feed on Cordia gerascanthus.

Etymology
The species is named in honor of Lou and Molly Tilney for their support of the Área de Conservación Guanacaste land purchase.

References

Moths described in 2014
tilneyorum